The Pacific Junior A Hockey League (PJHL) was a Canadian Junior "A" ice hockey league operating within the Greater Vancouver metropolitan area in British Columbia from 1971 until 1979.

History
From 1962 to 1967, a Pacific Coast Junior Hockey League (PCJHL) had been a Junior "A" league in British Columbia. That PCJHL folded when the New Westminster Royals and the Victoria Cougars moved to the Okanagan-Mainline Junior "A" Hockey League, which immediately renamed itself the British Columbia Junior Hockey League (BCJHL, shortened to BCHL in 1995).

In 1971, the Pacific Coast Junior Hockey League (PCJHL) name was revived by Fred Page for a new Junior "B" league, with all six teams located within the Greater Vancouver region. Page had deep roots in managing junior hockey leagues, and today there are two championship trophies named for himthe BCHL championship Fred Page Cup, and the Eastern Canada Junior "A" championship Fred Page Cup.

Page was successful in getting the PCJHL promoted to Tier II Junior "A" for the 1973–74 season, adjusting its name to the Pacific Junior A Hockey League (PJHL). Starting that season, the PJHL champion would compete with the BCJHL champion in the BC Junior "A" Championship, the Mowat Cup, with the winner moving on to what was the precursor to the Doyle Cup. The PJHL's Nor'Wes Caps won the 1976 Mowat Cup, while the PJHL's Richmond Sockeyes won the 1977 and 1979 Mowat Cups.

Page agreed to allow a merger between his PJHL and the BCJHL for the 1979–1980 season.

In five years of Junior "A" competition, after operating for only two seasons as a Junior "B" league, the PJHL defeated the more established BCJHL in three of five Mowat Cups.  In competition against the Alberta Junior Hockey League champion for the Pacific region championship, the PJHL champion went 0 for 3 and never got a chance to compete for the Western Championship Abbott Cup nor the National Championship Centennial Cup.

Teams
Chilliwack Bruins
Coquitlam Comets
Kerrisdale Couriers
Nor'Wes Caps
Richmond Sockeyes
Surrey Stampeders
Vancouver Jr. Canucks/Canadians

Champions
In the chart, league champions are bolded.

See also
Canadian Junior A Hockey League
Royal Bank Cup
Memorial Cup
Hockey Canada
British Columbia Hockey League
Kootenay International Junior Hockey League

External links
[ https://vernonjrahockey.ca/league/index-years.html BCHL History]

Defunct ice hockey leagues in British Columbia
Defunct junior ice hockey leagues in Canada
1971 establishments in British Columbia
1979 disestablishments in British Columbia
Sports leagues established in 1971
Sports leagues disestablished in 1979